Reidun Berit Laengen (3 December 1948 in Vågå - 9 October 1995) was a visually impaired Norwegian Paralympic athlete. She competed in cross-country skiing in the Paralympic Winter Games and athletics in the Paralympic Summer Games. She has a total of 3 golds and two silver medals .

Career 
At the 1976 Paralympic Winter Games, she won a gold medal in cross-country skiing 10 kilometers B, silver medal in cross-country skiing, 5 kilometers B, and silver medal  in cross-country skiing, 3 x 5 km relay (together with Aud Grundvik and Aud Berntsen ).

At the 1976 Paralympic Summer Games, she won two gold medals in 100 meters B, and long jump B.

References 

1948 births
1995 deaths
People from Vågå
Paralympic gold medalists for Norway
Paralympic cross-country skiers of Norway
Paralympic athletes of Norway
Norwegian female cross-country skiers
Norwegian female sprinters
Norwegian female long jumpers
Paralympic sprinters
Paralympic long jumpers
Visually impaired sprinters
Visually impaired long jumpers
Athletes (track and field) at the 1976 Summer Paralympics
Cross-country skiers at the 1976 Winter Paralympics
20th-century Norwegian women